Sigsbee may refer to 

 Charles Dwight Sigsbee, a Rear Admiral in the United States Navy
 Sigsbee (skipjack), listed on the National Register of Historic Places in Maryland
 Sigsbee, Missouri, an unincorporated community
 USS Sigsbee (DD-502), a former Fletcher-class destroyer